Omenuko by Pita Nwana (by trade a carpenter) is the first novel to be written in the Igbo language, and the book was very successful among the Igbo people. The book tells the life story of the politician Igwegbe Odum, an Aro Igbo who migrated to Arondizuogu.

Written in 1933, it won a prize in a competition run by the International African Institute and is the biography of the eponymous slave-dealer, originally being publisher in 1935.

References 

1935 Nigerian novels
Igbo-language mass media
Igbo culture